The JavaScript InfoVis Toolkit provides tools for creating Interactive Data Visualizations for the Web. The toolkit implements advanced features of information visualization like TreeMaps, an adapted visualization of trees based on the SpaceTree, a focus+context technique to plot Hyperbolic Trees, a radial layout of trees with advanced animations (RGraph) and other visualizations. 

In November 2010 the toolkit was acquired by the Sencha Labs Foundation. Further development on the toolkit involves WebGL support, CSS3 animations and more visualizations.

The JavaScript InfoVis Toolkit was chosen as a mentoring organization and project for the Google Summer of Code 2011

List of Featured Visualizations
Some of the featured visualizations are:
 RGraph
 HyperTree
 TreeMap
 Icicle
 SpaceTree
 Sunburst
 ForceDirected
 Area
 Bar
 Pie

Projects using the JavaScript InfoVis Toolkit
 The White House Budget Visualization
 Al jazeera Twitter Dashboard
 Mozilla Community Map
 Texas Tribune Legislature Application
 Argentinian Newspaper La Nacion News Cloud Application

References

External links
 
 Project Demos and Examples
 
 Project Discussion Group

Free software programmed in JavaScript
JavaScript libraries
JavaScript visualization toolkits
Software using the MIT license
Visualization API